Round Pond is an  reservoir in Duxbury, Massachusetts. The reservoir is located northeast of Pine Lake, northwest of Island Creek Pond, and southwest of North Hill Marsh Pond. An inlet provides the inflow for this reservoir from Pine Lake. The reservoir is associated hydro logically with an adjacent cranberry bog operation. It is a kettle hole formed by melting glaciers over ten thousand years ago. The north-west segment is bounded by a retaining berm that separates the pond from a cranberry bog.  A pump house sits at the western edge with an intake pipe extending into the pond.

External links
Environmental Protection Agency
South Shore Coastal Watersheds - Lake Assessments

Lakes of Plymouth County, Massachusetts
Duxbury, Massachusetts
Reservoirs in Massachusetts